Motu Piti Aau is a  island in the Bora Bora Islands Group, within the Society Islands of French Polynesia. It is located between Pitiuu Tai, and Tape.

Geography
Motu Piti Aau is a low island, with a small hill near Reva Reva ranch.

Administration
The island is part of Bora Bora Commune.

Demographics
Taurere, the main village of the island, is on the south west corner, facing Bora Bora Island.

Its current population includes many private households as the resorts staff usually commute daily to the pier at Eden beach.

Tourism
The Island boasts many resorts.
 Near the island of Tape, is Le Meridien Resort.
 Thalasso Intercontinental Resort
 Eden Beach Resort
 Bora Bora One Resort, near Taurere
 Chez Nono operates a camping facility in Fareone point, at the south of Piti Aau, the cheapest in Bora Bora.

Transportation

After arriving in Fa'a'ā International Airport, an Air Tahiti inter-island flight (50 minutes) will bring you to Bora Bora Airport.

You will need to board the airline’s catamaran shuttle to Vaitape, where resorts staff take boats.

References

External links